The Serbia and Montenegro Cup was an association football knockout cup tournament of Serbia and Montenegro played between 1992 and 2006, after which Serbia and Montenegro became separate nations. The competition was the continuation of the old Marshal Tito Cup of the SFR Yugoslavia, and it was named FR Yugoslavia Cup between 1992 and 2003, when the official name of the country was Federal Republic of Yugoslavia. It was renamed to Serbia and Montenegro Cup in 2003 when the country changed its official name. The cup was organized by the Football Association of Serbia and Montenegro.

This tournament was played for a total of 15 seasons, the tournament was dominated by Serbian clubs with no Montenegrin sides ever reaching the final. Belgrade club Red Star were the most successful club, reaching the final in all but two seasons and winning the tournament nine times.

Between 1993 and 1998, the finals were played on a home and away basis, but this was later changed to a single-game final.

After Montenegro proclaimed its independence in 2006, both football associations got to work on organizing a new tournament. The Football Association of Serbia formed a deal with Carlsberg affiliate Lav pivo and quickly formed the Lav Kup Srbije. Football Association of Montenegro had much more trouble organizing their cup tournament as most of the organizers of the Serbia and Montenegro cup were in Serbia and they directly inherited the rights to the former association as well as cup tournament. However, after a long and difficult struggle, the Montenegrin Cup was formed.

Finals

Note: In 2005 FK Železnik won the cup but after suffering financial problems the club merged with FK Voždovac and the trophy remains with the newly formed club. FK Sartid won the cup in 2003 and later changed its name back to FK Smederevo.

Performance by club

See also
 Yugoslav Cup
 Serbian Cup
 Montenegrin Cup

External links

 
Football in Serbia and Montenegro
Defunct football competitions in Serbia
Defunct football competitions in Montenegro
Football cup competitions in Serbia
1992 establishments in Yugoslavia
1992 disestablishments in Yugoslavia
Recurring sporting events established in 1992
Recurring sporting events disestablished in 2006